Takargo Rail is a Portuguese rail transport company founded in 2006 by Mota-Engil to take advantage of rail liberalisation in the European Union.

History
Founded in 2006 by Mota-Engil, the company was the first private train operator in Portugal, operating trains in 2008. The company is involved in the rail transport of maritime intermodal freight and bulk freights (aggregates, metals, raw materials).

A joint venture Ibercargo Rail was formed in 2009 with the Spanish company COMSA Rail Transport for rail freight operations between Spain and Portugal. The intermodal freight service was launched in 2010.

Rolling stock
As of 2009, the Takargo locomotive fleet includes seven Euro 4000 locomotives (Portuguese class 6000), and two Portuguese class 1400 diesel locomotives.

References

Rail transport companies of Portugal